The Y2Fly Seahawk is an American amphibious flying boat ultralight trike that was designed and produced by Y2Fly of Point Harbor, North Carolina. The aircraft was supplied as a completed aircraft.

Design and development
The Seahawk features a cable-braced hang glider-style high wing, weight-shift controls, a two-seats-in-tandem, open cockpit, a trimaran hull and a single engine in pusher configuration.

The aircraft hull is made from fiberglass, with stainless steel fittings. The wing and its supporting structure are made from bolted-together aluminum tubing, with the single surface wing covered in Dacron sailcloth and supported by a single tube-type kingpost. The Seahawk uses an "A" frame control bar for weight-shift control. The hull was carefully designed to account for the inherent lack of pitch control that trikes have while on the water. It was designed to reduce porpoising and water spray being thrown into the crew seats and propeller. The hull also provides lift in flight and allows flight at reduced power and fuel consumption. The retractable landing gear is of tricycle configuration and is mechanically retracted by a lever located next to the pilot. The nosewheel retracts in front of the bow of the hull, while the main landing gear retracts beside the tri-hull. The standard powerplant supplied was the twin cylinder, two-stroke, liquid-cooled  Rotax 582 aircraft engine.

Specifications (Seahawk)

References

1990s United States ultralight aircraft
Single-engined pusher aircraft
Ultralight trikes